William H. Appleton (March 24, 1843 - September 9, 1912) was an American soldier who received the Medal of Honor for valor during the American Civil War.

Biography
William was born on the 24th of March, 1843, in Chichester, New Hampshire, where his father was a wheelwright. Bill enlisted in the Union Army in May 1861 at the age of 19 and was assigned to Company I of the 2nd New Hampshire Infantry. Bill fought at First Manassas, the Peninsula Campaign, Second Manassas, Fredericksburg, and Gettysburg before joining a newly formed unit, the 4th US Colored Infantry. This unit was formed in Baltimore, Maryland on the 15th of July, 1863, and William Appleton joined Company H as a Second Lieutenant in August that same year. It was his actions at the Second Battle of Petersburg that would earn him a promotion and the Medal of Honor.

 William Appleton was able to lead the charge and was unscathed at the end. One other officer was killed, along with five others wounded in the same battle. Bill was promoted to captain and moved to command Company E, where they would go on to fight at and capture Fort Fisher in January 1865. Appleton and the 4th US Colored Infantry were mustered out of service in May 1866 and little else is known about his post service life is known. Bill was brevet promoted to Major before his end of service and Bill received his Medal of Honor on the 18th of February, 1891. William  Appleton died on the 9th of September, 1912, at the age of 69 years old and is buried in the Evergreen Cemetery in Pembroke, New Hampshire.

Medal of Honor citation
Citation:

The first man of the Eighteenth Corps to enter the enemy's works at Petersburg, Va., 15 June 1864. Valiant service in a desperate assault at New Market Heights, Va., inspiring the Union troops by his example of steady courage.

See also

List of American Civil War Medal of Honor recipients: A-F

References

External links

Military Times
Tim Talbott
Tales of Honor Podcast

1843 births
1912 deaths
Appleton family
Union Army soldiers
United States Army Medal of Honor recipients
People of New Hampshire in the American Civil War
People from Chichester, New Hampshire
American Civil War recipients of the Medal of Honor